Nova Gora may refer to the following places in Slovenia:

Nova Gora, Dolenjske Toplice, a village in the Municipality of Dolenjske Toplice
Nova Gora, Krško, a village in the Municipality of Krško
Nova Gora, Litija, a village in the Municipality of Litija
Nova Gora nad Slovensko Bistrico, a village in the Municipality of Slovenska Bistrica

See also
Gora (disambiguation)